Uganda Airlines  is the flag carrier of Uganda. The company is a revival of the older Uganda Airlines which operated from 1977 until 2001. The current carrier began flying in August 2019.

Location

History

Following studies and wide consultations, the Cabinet of Uganda opted to re-launch Uganda Airlines, with six new jets, two of which are the wide-body, long-range A330-800 and the other four being CRJ900 aircraft. The studies recommended an equity investment by the government of approximately US$70 million and loans totaling US$330 million, borrowed from regional lenders, such as the Trade and Development Bank, to complete the purchase.

In May 2018, The EastAfrican reported that the Ugandan government had made a small monetary deposit on each of the six aircraft, while it concludes final financing arrangements. The first batch of CRJ900 aircraft was expected in November 2018, while the delivery of the A330-800 planes was expected in December 2020.

As of 19 March 2019, according to Ephraim Bagenda, the company's chief executive at the time, 12 pilots and 12 co-pilots (total of 24 cockpit crew), all of them Ugandans, had completed their training and certification on the CRJ900-ER aircraft. The first two regional jets were expected in Uganda in April 2019. The third jet was scheduled for delivery in July 2019 and the fourth CRJ900 was expected in September 2019. Between April and June 2019, the airline planned to obtain an Air operator's certificate (AOC) from the Uganda Civil Aviation Authority and start operations by 30 June 2019. On 8 April 2019, the expected delivery date for the first two jets (5X-EQU and 5X-KOB) was reported as Tuesday 23 April 2019.

In April 2019, the delivery of the first Bombardier CRJ900 was confirmed as 23 April 2019 and that of the first Airbus A330-800 as the first half of 2021.

On 27 July 2019, the Uganda Civil Aviation Authority awarded Uganda National Airlines Company with an Air Operator Certificate, finalizing a five-step, three-month certification process that cleared the airline to commence commercial operations. On 2 August 2019, the airline announced the launch date as the 28th of the same month, with flights to Nairobi, Mogadishu, Dar es Salaam, Juba, Kilimanjaro, Mombasa and Bujumbura.

On the morning of 28 August 2019, Uganda Airlines had its first commercial flight from Entebbe to Jomo Kenyatta International Airport (JKIA) with eight passengers on board.

On 13 November 2019, Uganda Airlines launched the first flight to Kilimanjaro International Airport; thereby completing the first phase of operations to seven routes which was started with flights to Jomo Kenyatta International Airport nearly three months earlier.

On 16 December 2019, Uganda Airlines commenced regular commercial passenger service to Zanzibar in Tanzania. The three-times-weekly service, brought the airline's destinations to eight in the second phase of route expansion.

On 1 October 2020, after a six-months pause in scheduled passenger service, due to travel restrictions imposed as a result of the COVID-19 pandemic, Uganda Airlines resumed scheduled passenger service, in a phased manner. On that day, the airline's hub, Entebbe International Airport that had been closed to passenger traffic since March 2020, was opened for resumed passenger service.

On 18 December 2020, Uganda Airlines launched commercial flights to Kinshasa in the Democratic Republic of the Congo. The three times weekly operation increased the airline's expanding network to ten destinations.

Destinations

It is expected that when Kabaale International Airport is completed in 2021, a network of flights to local, regional and international destinations, will be developed around the new airport.

With the two A330-800 aircraft expected in December 2020 and January 2021, Uganda Airlines is expected to start flights to Europe, Asia and the Middle East during the first quarter of 2021. The intercontinental and intracontinental destinations under consideration include: Heathrow Airport, Dubai International Airport, Guangzhou Baiyun International Airport, Mumbai International Airport, airports in West Africa and airports in Southern Africa.

In October 2020, it was reported that Uganda Airlines had received regulatory approval to begin scheduled passenger service to South Africa. The airline began service between Entebbe Airport and O. R. Tambo International Airport, four times a week, effective 31 May 2021.

On 2 March 2021, it was reported that the airline would commence five-times-weekly scheduled service between Entebbe and London Heathrow on 28 March 2021, using the A330-800 equipment. However, the service did not commence as originally planned due to failure of the airline to get the aircraft appropriately certified by Uganda Civil Aviation Authority. Appropriate certification of the A330-800s was obtained on 20 August 2021.

On 4 October 2021, Uganda Airlines started intercontinental flights, with three times weekly direct passenger service between Entebbe International Airport (EBB) and Dubai International Airport (DXB), using the A330-800 equipment. Four weeks later, during the first week of November 2021, the frequency between the two cities was increased to four times weekly, as a result of heavy load factors.

In January 2022, Uganda Airlines senior management indicated that their focus included (a) the establishment of a domestic service in collaboration with existing domestic operators (b) increasing the number of destinations in Europe and DR Congo (c) establishment of service to China, Saudi Arabia, Nigeria and India (d) Acquisition of an Approved Maintenance Organization (AMO) certification. Management plans to start self ground handling at Entebbe Airport in 2022, to reduce expenses.

In June 2022, Ugandan online media reported that the Chinese authorities had granted Uganda Airlines one landing slot a week at Guangzhou International Airport. It is expected that at a future date, yet to be announced, UR will begin the nine-hour direct weekly flights between Entebbe and Guangzhou.

In November 2022 Simple Flying, an online publication, 
reported that the airline is expected to start direct flights between Entebbe and Lagos, Nigeria in December 2022 and between Entebbe and Abuja, Nigeria in 2023. At that time, flights to Guangzhou, China were held up by COVID-19 restrictions there.
Flights to London Heathrow were also on hold, despite having obtained landing rights.

Fleet
As of February 2021, the airline operates the following aircraft: The aircraft were procured new from Airbus in Europe and Bombardier Aerospace in Canada.

In February 2019, the first of four CRJ900 aircraft that Uganda Airlines had ordered, took her first test flight with the livery of the new airline. On 29 March 2019, the Ugandan parliament approved a request by the Ugandan government for USh 280 billion (approx. US$76 million), to pay for the first two CRJ900s, expected to arrive in Uganda in April 2019.

The third and fourth CRJ900 aircraft were delivered during the middle of October 2019, according to the Uganda Ministry of Works and Transport. On 5 October 2019, the third and fourth CRJ900s, 5X–KDP and 5X–KNP left Montreal, Canada on their delivery journey to Entebbe, Uganda, landing there on 7 October 2019.

On 8 April 2019, the airline firmed up its order for two A330-841s. On 16 October 2020, the first of two A330-841s that the airline ordered, registration number 5X-NIL, left the paint shop at Toulouse, France, with the livery of the airline. Delivery of the first aircraft took place on 21 December 2020.

On that date, Airbus handed over the first of two A330-841s that the airline ordered in 2018, to a delegation of Ugandan government officials, led by General Katumba Wamala, the then Ugandan Minister of Works and Transport. A team of Ugandan pilots flew the aircraft, registration number 5X-NIL from Toulouse, France to Entebbe, Uganda on 22 December 2020, as flight number UR404. Aviation YouTuber Josh Cahill was also part of the delivery flight to Entebbe who documented the journey for his channel.

On 2 February 2021 the second of two A330-841s, registration number 5X-CRN was delivered from Toulouse, France to Entebbe, Uganda as flight number UR406, bringing the airline's fleet count to six aircraft.

On 12 August 2021, one of the airline's Airbus A330-800s, with registration 5X-NIL flew to Johannesburg, South Africa on a demonstration flight as part of the final stages in the certification process for the aircraft.

On 20 August 2021, the two Airbus A330-800 aircraft, 5X-NIL and 5X-CRN were given appropriate certification and added to the airlines' Air Operators Certificate (AOC), by the Uganda Civil Aviation Authority (UCAA).

Interline agreements
Effective March 2021, Uganda Airlines maintains an interline agreement with Emirates Airlines. In August 2021, The Citizen (Tanzania) newspaper reported that the airline had signed interline agreements with Emirates Airlines, Qatar Airways, Hahn Air and APG Airlines of France. At that time UR was negotiating interline agreements with Air Tanzania and Precision Air.

Associations and memberships
In September 2019, Uganda National Airlines Company Limited was admitted as a member of the African Airlines Association, (AFRAA).

In February 2021, Uganda Airlines signed an agreement with Rolls-Royce Limited, the manufacturer of the airline's A330-800 engines, assigning the maintenance of the engines to Rolls-Royce, under their TotalCare program. The airline will be charged an hourly fee for every one hour of flight, for every Rolls-Royce Trent 7000 engine in the fleet.

In November 2021, the airline signed a Flight Hour Services (FHS) agreement with Airbus, for after-sales support and training. The agreement includes "on-site engineering, repairs, and timely spare parts availability", for the next five years.

In January 2022, the airline began the process of obtaining IATA Operational Safety Audit (IOSA) certification, with expected conclusion in the fourth quarter of 2022.

Corporate issues

Ownership
The airline is jointly owned by two Ugandan Cabinet Ministries; the Ministry of Finance, Planning and Economic Development and the Ministry of Works and Transport, on a 50/50 basis.

Governance
The airline was governed by a seven-person board of directors, including the following:

 Godfrey Perez Ahabwe (Economist): Chairperson
 Benon Kajuna (Transport economist): Representing the Uganda Ministry of Works and Transport
 Godfrey Ssemugooma: Representing the Uganda Ministry of Finance, Planning and Economic Development
 Catherine Asinde Poran: Independent, Non-Executive Director
 Rehema Mutazindwa: Independent, Non-Executive Director
 Charles Hamya: Independent, Non-Executive Director
 Stephen Aziku Zua: Independent, Non-Executive Director

On 30 April 2021, the entire board of directors was suspended by the Minister of Transport and Works, Gen. Katumba Wamala, due to allegations of corruption, mismanagement and poor performance.

In January 2022, the New Vision newspaper reported that the suspended board members had been asked to resign, so that their terminal benefits could be processed. According to the newspaper, each board member would receive USh30 million (approx. US$8,640) in a lump sum and a monthly payment of USh5 million (approx. US$1,440), for six months thereafter.

In March 2022, a new seven-person board of directors was appointed to replace the first board whose members had resigned at the request of the shareholders. The new board members are:

 Priscilla Mirembe Serukka (Chairperson)
 Ebrahim Kisoro Sadrudin
 Herbert Kamuntu
 Abdi Karim Moding
 Barbara Mirembe Namugambe
 Samson Rwahwire
 Patrick Ocailap.

Staff
In September 2018, the airline placed advertisements in the local print media for prospective airline staff, including directors for maintenance, engineering, commercial affairs and finance. Also corporate quality manager, human resource, ground operations, sales and marketing, cabin services and planning managers are being sought for recruitment. Pilots, cabin crew staff, ticketing officers, human resource officers, IT personnel, station managers and accountants are among the many available positions. In February 2019, The Independent reported that a total of sixteen pilots of the twenty four that had been recruited were sent for training on the operation of the CRJ900 aircraft. Eight were sent to Mirabel, near Montreal, where the jets are assembled. Another eight were sent to a facility in France. When the airline becomes fully functional, a total of thirty-six pilots will have been recruited and trained. As of April 2019, 200 staff positions of an estimated 400 vacancies had been filled.

In October 2019, the airline's board of directors began a search for a new substantive chief executive officer. The then CEO, Ephraim Bagyenda, was reassigned to Director of Engineering and Maintenance. Cornwell Muleya, the airline's technical director, was appointed CEO, in an acting capacity. As of July 2020, the search for a substantive CEO was ongoing. In the meantime, Cornwell Muleya's contract as acting CEO was extended to February 2021. In April 2021, the Daily Monitor reported that Cornwell Muleya's short-term contract had been extended a third time for another 18 months to September 2022. Meantime, the search for a substantive CEO continues.

As of February 2021, according to The Independent, Uganda newsmagazine, Uganda Airlines employed 50 pilots, of whom five (10 percent) were female and 45 (90 percent), were male. Of the 50 pilots, 42 (84 percent) were Ugandan nationals. Two female pilots; Vanita Kayiwa and Tina Drazu, are first officers on the A330-800 equipment.

On 30 April 2021, the Minister of Transport and Works, Gen. Katumba Wamala, terminated CEO Cornwell Muleya and suspended the entire management team and board of directors due to allegations of corruption, mismanagement and poor performance. In February 2022, the government of Uganda officially ended the employment contracts of Cornwell Muleya, the former CEO, together with the contracts of 12 other former senior managers at the airline. Jenifer Bamuturaki was appointed as the first substantive CEO of the airline, in July 2022.

Self ground handling
In July 2022, the ground handling contract that the airline had with DAS Handling Limited at its base at Entebbe Airport expired. New ground handling equipment was procured and 160 new staff were hired to start the self handling process. The contract with Das Handling was extended through August and September 2022. Das is training the new staff on handling the new equipment and on how to run the ground handling business. The airline is expected to start self ground handling in October 2022. This will save the airline US$250,000 per month in fees.

Business trends
Full detailed accounts are rarely published, although intermittently some figures are made public by senior management or the government, or in government budgetary reports. Available trends are shown below.

Training
On 10 June 2022, training was provided to 21 Uganda Airlines staff on the RVSM Continued Airworthiness & Maintenance Requirements. The course occurred via webinar and was conducted by Aleksandr Rudnev, an instructor from Sofema Aviation Services, based in Sofia, Bulgaria.

Awards and recognition
In March 2021, Uganda Airlines was awarded the World's Youngest Aircraft Fleet Award, given by Ch-Aviation, an industry information collector and publisher based in the city of Chur, in Switzerland. The publication cited the average age of the aircraft in the Uganda Airlines fleet at 1.15 years as of March 2021. In January 2022, Uganda Airlines again topped the list of the youngest fleet among the world's airlines. Its 6 aircraft averaged 2.06 years, as of January 2022.

Notes

References

External links
 Official Website
 Airbus has a $260 million wide-body jet that it just can't sell. See inside the A330-800neo As of 26 December 2021.
 Uganda Airlines looks to buy A320’s for growth As of 22 November 2021.

Airlines of Uganda
Airlines established in 2018
2018 establishments in Uganda
Government-owned airlines
Government-owned companies of Uganda
Organisations based in Entebbe